Solanum cerasiferum is a species of plant in the nightshade family. It is native to tropical Africa.

The species is andromonoecious. However, the species overall has a weaker andromonoecy than its relatives. The is morphological of this species is similar to Solanum campylacanthum.

The plant is an erect, pale yellow-orange, prickly shrub-like herb that bears spherical berry fruit and flowers.

References 

cerasiferum